The  Ee 3/3IV is a railway locomotive; the most modern version of the Ee 3/3 it was specially designed for service in frontier stations.  The complicated equipment needed for four different electrical systems required a higher and wider body in front of and behind the cab and a reduction in power.  Nevertheless, thanks to a modern crank drive, a maximum speed of 60 km/h can be attained.

Drive 
The Ee 3/3IV are used in French and Italian frontier stations (mostly Geneva)  on similar duty to the previous versions.  All locomotives were equipped with a multiple drive in 1994 similar to the SBB Ee 3/3 II|Ee 3/3II. During the upgrade the locomotives received new service numbers (Ee 934).

They were occasionally used to haul passenger trains between La Plaine and Geneva when the  SBB-CFF-FFS BDe 4/4 II were being repaired, due to the 1500 V DC catenary.

See also 

 List of stock used by Swiss Federal Railways
 Swiss Federal Railways

External links 
 Bilder der Ee 3/3 IV im digitalen Eisenbahn Fotoarchiv 
 Site von Bruno Lämmli

Electric locomotives of Switzerland